Hemiarcha polioleuca is a moth in the family Gelechiidae. It was described by Turner in 1919. It is found in Australia, where it has been recorded from Queensland.

The wingspan is about 13 mm. The forewings are pale-grey with the costa suffusedly whitish from the base to three-fourths. The hindwings are whitish.

References

Hemiarcha
Moths described in 1919